is a town located in Kasuya District, Fukuoka Prefecture, Japan.

As of May 1, 2017, the town has an estimated population of 8,641 and a density of 230 persons per km2. The total area is 37.43 km2. Hisayama has had a Costco since 1999.

References

External links

Hisayama official website 

Towns in Fukuoka Prefecture